The R397 road is a regional road in Ireland linking Longford Town to Ballymahon all in County Longford. It passes through the village of Keenagh en route.

See also
Roads in Ireland
National primary road
National secondary road

References
Roads Act 1993 (Classification of Regional Roads) Order 2006 – Department of Transport

Regional roads in the Republic of Ireland
Roads in County Longford